Sotahuuto (Finnish for "battle cry" or "war cry") is the sixth studio album by the Finnish black metal band Horna. It was released on November 6, 2007 by Grievantee Productions on CD, by Deviant Records on vinyl, which were limited to 500 copies, and by Moribund Records. The album was a tribute to Bathory and was written in spring 2004.

Track listing
 "Lähtölaukaus" – 5:01　(English: The Starting Shot)
 "Vapise, Vapahtaja" – 4:23　(English: Quiver, Saviour)
 "Verimalja" – 4:19 　(English: Chalice of Blood)
 "Tuhontuoja" – 4:57　(English: Bringer of Destruction)
 "Sodanjano" – 4:54　(English: Thirst for War)
 "Ukkosmarssi" – 3:02　(English: March of Thunder)
 "Sotahuuto" – 3:19　(English: Battle Cry / War Cry)
 "Vihanlietsoja" – 3:49　(English: Hatemonger)
 "Tulikäsky" – 2:42　(English: Commandment of Fire)

Personnel
 Corvus – vocals
 Shatraug – guitar
 Sargofagian – drums

Additional personnel
 Christophe Szpajdel - logo

Footnotes

External links
 Official Horna site – Discography

Horna albums
2007 albums